Amherst Peak is a mountain in the city and borough of Juneau, Alaska, United States. It is a part of the Boundary Ranges of the Coast Mountains in western North America.

The mountain's name was published locally by the United States Geological Survey (USGS) in 1960; it was collected by the USGS between 1976 and 1981, and entered into the Survey's Geographic Names Information System on March 31, 1981.

References

Mountains of Alaska
Boundary Ranges
Mountains of Juneau, Alaska